Creeping normality (also called gradualism, or landscape amnesia) is a process by which a major change can be accepted as normal and acceptable if it happens slowly through small, often unnoticeable, increments of change. The change could otherwise be regarded as remarkable and objectionable if it took place in a single step or short period.

American scientist Jared Diamond used creeping normality in his 2005 book Collapse: How Societies Choose to Fail or Succeed.  Prior to releasing his book, Diamond explored this theory while attempting to explain why, in the course of long-term environmental degradation, Easter Island natives would, seemingly irrationally, chop down the last tree:

See also 
There are a number of metaphors related to creeping normality, including:

 Boiling frog
 Camel's nose
 Lingchi
 "First they came ..."
 Habituation
 If You Give a Mouse a Cookie
 Normalisation of deviance
 Overton window
 Principiis obsta (et respice finem) - 'resist the beginnings (and consider the end)'
 Salami tactics
 Shifting baseline
 Slippery slope
 Technological change as a social process
 Tyranny of small decisions

References 

Perception
Business terms
Technological change